Jessica Patricia Rodríguez Clark  (born September 18, 1981) is a pageant titleholder, was born in Ciudad de Panamá, Panamá.  She was the official representative of Panamá in the 53rd Miss Universe 2004 pageant, was held at the Centro de Convenciones CEMEXPO, Quito, Ecuador, on 1 June 2004. She won the Best National Costume.

She represented Panama Centro state.

Personal life

Rodríguez is today a recognized TV host in Guatemala. She currently lives in Guatemala City.

References

External links
Últimas Noticias de Panamá y el Mundo | Telemetro Señorita Panamá official website
MissPanama.net 

1982 births
Living people
Miss Universe 2004 contestants
Panamanian beauty pageant winners
Panamanian female models
Señorita Panamá